George Washington on Horseback is an equestrian statue by sculptor Herbert Haseltine. It is located south of the Washington National Cathedral.

It was dedicated on February 22, 1959.

See also
 List of monuments dedicated to George Washington
 List of statues of George Washington
 List of sculptures of presidents of the United States

References

External links
 

1959 establishments in Washington, D.C.
1959 sculptures
Bronze sculptures in Washington, D.C.
Statues of George Washington
Equestrian statues in Washington, D.C.
Outdoor sculptures in Washington, D.C.
Washington National Cathedral
Monuments and memorials to George Washington in the United States